Leonid Yulianovich Belakhov (Russian: Леонид Юлианович Белахов, June 9, 1907 – June 9, 1975) was a general and a senior Soviet administrator at the time of World War II, and managed several strategic logistical programs that influenced the course of the war, including the transportation of war aid from the US through the Lend-Lease program and of troops and fuel for the beginning of the offensive against the Nazi Germany's invasion of the USSR.

Biography

Arctic exploration

In 1937, after finishing the air force command academy, Belakhov was appointed head of political administration of the Chief Directorate of the Northern Sea Route (GlavSevMorPut), one of the largest Soviet agencies, governing the Soviet territory north of the Arctic Circle and east of the Ural mountains. In this role, Belakhov oversaw the internal affairs of the agency and the logistics of the Arctic exploration programs. 

The agency was at that time headed by Otto Schmidt. Belakhov continued as the political chief under Ivan Papanin, the new chief of CDNSR after Otto Schmidt's resignation from the agency's leadership in 1939.

World War II

In 1940, Belakhov was appointed head of political administration and deputy minister of the Soviet Merchant Fleet. In this capacity, Belakhov was commissioned to manage several key projects, reporting to Anastas Mikoyan, the deputy head of the government and a stalwart of Soviet politics. The projects included the organization of transportation of war aid to the USSR from the U.S. through the Lend-Lease program, supply of fuel and transportation of troops for the Battle of Stalingrad.

Family

Belakhov was married to Maria Belakhova, a writer and educator known for her work in children's literature and education in the Soviet Union, mentorship of many of the country's prominent children's writers, and her own works.

References

 Mikoyan, Anastas I. "It Was Thus: Memoirs of Anastas Mikoyan.". Trans. Katherine T. O’Connor and Diana L. Burgin. Madison, CT: Sphinx Press, 1988. .
 Valentin Akuratov "On New Routes". GlavSevMorPut Press, USSR, 1941. 
 John McCannon "Red Arctic: Polar Exploration and the Myth of the North in the Soviet Union, 1932-1939". Oxford University Press, USA, 1998. .  
 Aleksey Shahurin "Wings Of Victory". Politizdat, USSR, 1990.

External links
 Chief Directorate of the Northern Sea Route
 https://web.archive.org/web/20110703055647/http://rusarchives.ru/secret/842.shtml
 http://www.e-reading.org.ua/bookreader.php/85406/Na_novyh_trassah.html
 http://militera.lib.ru/memo/russian/mikoyan/04.html
 http://militera.lib.ru/h/kymanev_ga2/04.html
 http://www.razumei.ru/files/others/pdf/Shahurin_kryliya_pobedy.pdf
 https://web.archive.org/web/20120321143640/http://www.melgrosh.unimelb.edu.au/php/index.php?section=pol&page=meetHome&id=4335&orderBy=name
 http://ru.wikisource.org/wiki/%D0%96%D1%83%D1%80%D0%BD%D0%B0%D0%BB_%D0%BF%D0%BE%D1%81%D0%B5%D1%89%D0%B5%D0%BD%D0%B8%D0%B9_%D0%A1%D1%82%D0%B0%D0%BB%D0%B8%D0%BD%D0%B0/1943
 http://lost-empire.ru/index.php?option=com_content&task=view&id=2594&Itemid=
 http://catalog.loc.gov/cgi-bin/Pwebrecon.cgi?BBRecID=8492335&v3=1&SEQ=20110319105118&PID=g7NP7WoxZsTyo8aFeo21sg80
 http://catalog.loc.gov/cgi-bin/Pwebrecon.cgi?BBRecID=7168098&v3=1&SEQ=20110319105121&PID=uptueB-dklggj4OOWRc9El_C
 http://catalog.loc.gov/cgi-bin/Pwebrecon.cgi?BBRecID=7127316&v3=1&SEQ=20110319105222&PID=bllm4jITr11A_ssxWJJ-zWLx
 http://catalog.loc.gov/cgi-bin/Pwebrecon.cgi?BBRecID=8080655&v3=1&SEQ=20110319105125&PID=yT7MB11wossxrE22TUGZU8gW
 http://generals.dk/general/Belakhov/Leonid_Iulianovich/Soviet_Union.html
 https://web.archive.org/web/20160303204657/http://www.knowbysight.info/2_KPSS/10306.asp
 http://english.ruvr.ru/2008/02/26/179328.html
 http://english.ruvr.ru/2007/12/19/168522.html
 http://murmanarchiv.ru/index.php?option=com_content&view=article&id=170:2010-04-21-06-11-22&catid=38:the-great-patriotic-war-on-the-kola-north&Itemid=82

1907 births
1975 deaths
Military personnel from Vinnytsia
People from Vinnitsky Uyezd
Communist Party of the Soviet Union members
People's commissars and ministers of the Soviet Union
Members of the Supreme Soviet of the Russian Soviet Federative Socialist Republic, 1938–1947
Soviet major generals
Exploration of the Arctic
Polar exploration by Russia and the Soviet Union
Arctic research
Arctic expeditions
Soviet military personnel of World War II
Recipients of the Order of Lenin
Recipients of the Order of the Red Banner
Recipients of the Order of the Red Banner of Labour
Recipients of the Order of the Red Star

